Plouguenast-Langast is a commune in the Côtes-d'Armor department of Brittany in northwestern France. It was established on 1 January 2019 by merger of the former communes of Plouguenast (the seat) and Langast.

Geography

Climate
Plouguenast-Langast has a oceanic climate (Köppen climate classification Cfb).

Population

See also
Communes of the Côtes-d'Armor department

References

Communes of Côtes-d'Armor

Communes nouvelles of Côtes-d'Armor
Populated places established in 2019
2019 establishments in France